The 2011 Caloundra International was a professional tennis tournament played on outdoor hard courts. It was part of the 2011 ATP Challenger Tour. It took place in Caloundra, Australia between 7 and 13 February 2011.

ATP entrants

Seeds

 Rankings are as of 31 January 2011.

Other entrants
The following players received wildcards into the singles main draw:
  Matthew Barton
  James Duckworth
  James Lemke
  Benjamin Mitchell

The following players received a Special Exempt into the main draw:
  Chris Guccione

The following players received entry from the qualifying draw:
  Dayne Kelly
  Wu Di
  Yang Tsung-hua
  Daniel Yoo

Champions

Singles

 Grega Žemlja def.  Bernard Tomic, 7–6(4), 6–3

Doubles

 Matthew Ebden /  Samuel Groth def.  Pavol Červenák /  Ivo Klec, 6–3, 3–6, [10–1]

External links